Clayton is a city in Decatur and Norton counties in the U.S. state of Kansas.  As of the 2020 census, the population of the city was 44.

History
The first post office in Clayton was established in March 1879. Clayton was named for the valuable clay found in the vicinity.

Clayton was incorporated as a city in 1907.

Geography
Clayton is located at  (39.737247, -100.176818).

Demographics

2010 census
As of the census of 2010, there were 59 people, 23 households, and 19 families living in the city. The racial makeup of the city was 96.6% White and 3.4% Native American. Hispanic or Latino of any race were 1.7% of the population.

There were 23 households, of which 21.7% had children under the age of 18 living with them, 56.5% were married couples living together, 13.0% had a female householder with no husband present, 13.0% had a male householder with no wife present, and 17.4% were non-families. 17.4% of all households were made up of individuals. The average household size was 2.57 and the average family size was 2.74.

The median age in the city was 50.9 years. 16.9% of residents were under the age of 18; 5.2% were between the ages of 18 and 24; 18.7% were from 25 to 44; 42.5% were from 45 to 64; and 16.9% were 65 years of age or older. The gender makeup of the city was 52.5% male and 47.5% female.

2000 census
As of the census of 2000, there were 66 people, 27 households, and 18 families living in the city. The racial makeup of the city was 98.48% White, and 1.52% from two or more races.

There were 27 households, out of which 29.6% had children under the age of 18 living with them, 59.3% were married couples living together, and 33.3% were non-families. 25.9% of all households were made up of individuals, and 3.7% had someone living alone who was 65 years of age or older. The average household size was 2.44 and the average family size was 3.00.

In the city, the population was spread out, with 25.8% under the age of 18, 3.0% from 18 to 24, 24.2% from 25 to 44, 33.3% from 45 to 64, and 13.6% who were 65 years of age or older. The median age was 44 years. For every 100 females, there were 120.0 males. For every 100 females age 18 and over, there were 113.0 males.

The median income for a household in the city was $35,750, and the median income for a family was $35,625. Males had a median income of $39,375 versus $21,250 for females. The per capita income for the city was $13,519. There were 13.3% of families and 10.3% of the population living below the poverty line, including no under eighteens and none of those over 64.

Education
Clayton and rural areas east of the community are served by Norton USD 211 public school district.  Northwest rural areas (north of highway 383) are served by Oberlin USD 294.  Southwest rural areas (south of highway 383) are served by Hoxie USD 412.

In 2010, Norton USD 211 absorbed the former West Solomon USD 213, which had dissolved.

Clayton schools were closed through school unification. The Clayton High School mascot was Bulldogs.

References

Further reading

External links
 Clayton - Directory of Public Officials
 Clayton city map, KDOT

Cities in Kansas
Cities in Decatur County, Kansas
Cities in Norton County, Kansas